Brayan Lopez (born 20 June 1997 in San Juan de la Maguana) is an Italian sprinter.

Career
He won the bronze medal at 400 m during the 2019 European Athletics U23 Championships. He also won the relay 4x400 metres at the 2019 European Team Championships in Bydgoszcz, with a European Lead Best.

Achievements

References

External links
 

Italian male sprinters
1997 births
Living people
World Athletics Championships athletes for Italy
Dominican Republic emigrants to Italy